Guo Liang (born 11 November 1970) is a Chinese-born Singaporean actor and television host.

Career

Guo graduated from the Shanghai Drama Institute and moved to Singapore during the 1990s to join the Television Corporation of Singapore (predecessor of MediaCorp). He joined TCS in 1994. He joined SPH MediaWorks in late 2000 but returned to MediaCorp in 2005 when the two companies merged. Although trained as an actor, he is mostly known in Singapore as a presenter of MediaCorp Channel 8 current affairs programme Hello Singapore (狮城有约) but he stop as a presenter as he will return to MediaCorp as a full-time artiste and host of the Star Awards.

In 2019, Guo undertakes as a host for a new dating variety show - The Destined One.

Personal life
Guo married Jade Shen Jie, a Chinese citizen, in 1994 and has a son, Marcus. He took up Singaporean citizenship in 2001 and his wife took up Singaporean citizenship in 2015.

In 2010, Guo and Elvin Ng were reportedly engaged in an online feud over comments exchanged in the dressing room during filming of the drama series Breakout. The incident was notably parodied in a skit at the Star Awards 2011 in which Christopher Lee, portraying series director Chong Liung Man, tells their respective characters to "stop fighting" and "write on [their] blogs".

Filmography

Compilation album

Awards and nominations

References

External links
Profile on xinmsn
Archived Bio on MediaCorp TV website

1968 births
Living people
Chinese emigrants to Singapore
Male actors from Shanghai
Singaporean male television actors
Singaporean television personalities
Naturalised citizens of Singapore
Chinese male film actors
Chinese male television actors
20th-century Chinese male actors
21st-century Chinese male actors
20th-century Singaporean male actors
21st-century Singaporean male actors